This is a list of Oklahoma Sooners college football players who were named first team All-Americans. The selecting organizations for football All-Americans that the NCAA recognizes include the Associated Press, American Football Coaches Association, Football Writers Association of America, The Sporting News, and the Walter Camp Football Foundation. The NCAA defines consensus All-Americans as players who were accorded a majority of votes at their positions by these selectors. Unanimous All-Americans are players who were selected by all five selectors.

Oklahoma has had 167 first team All-Americans in its history. 82 of these were consensus, and 35 were unanimous. OU has the most unanimous All-Americans in the history of college football and the most consensus All-Americans since World War II.

All-Americans

References

Oklahoma Sooners

Oklahoma Sooners football All-Americans